The Parables of Our Lord and Saviour Jesus Christ Done into Familiar Verse, with Occasional Applications, for the Use and Improvement of Younger Minds was written by Christopher Smart and published in 1768. The Parables are a collection of parables from the Bible which includes lessons from both the Old and New Testament.

The Parables, as with Hymns for the Amusement of Children, was part of Smart's attempt to create religious literature dedicated to children.

Background
The Parables were printed in March 1768 and were advertised in the London Chronicle on 31 March 1768. They were dedicated to the young son of Christopher Smart's friend, Bonnell Thornton. Bonnell Thorton was a close friend of Christopher Smart, and he worked with Smart on The Student magazine and supported Smart during and after his time in a mental asylum. In the dedication, Smart wrote:
"There are sundry Instances of our Blessed SAVIOUR'S Fondness for Children, as a Man; and He has assured us, we can have no Part in Him without imitating their Innocence and Simplicity. This is so evident, that though you are yet scarce three Years of Age, you will soon be able to read and understand it: and in a Season will reflect, I trust, with Pleasure that you have been the Patron of a well-intended Work, almost as soon as you could go alone..."

However, this dedication to a child of three incurred a review from the Monthly Review stating, "This version of the parables is, with great properiety, dedicated to Master Bonnell George Thorton: a child of three years old", which was intended to mock the simplicity of the Parables. The Critical Review simply stated that the work revealed Christopher Smart's poetry as being "unequal" and of "the lower class", and while it "may certainly be of use" to children, it could not "please their imaginations, or improve their taste in poetry."

Parables of Our Lord
Like the Hymns for the Amusement of Children, Smart's The Parables of Our Lord and Saviour Jesus Christ were designed to teach morals to the young. However, Smart believed that salvation would not require a strong intellectual understanding of the Bible. In order to fulfill this belief, Smart created his Parables by altering the original Biblical parables, in order to simplify them and help them "make sense", and followed up each parable with a short explanation. Although there are many alterations and additions, Smart stays true to his Biblical sources, or, at least, how they are translated in the Authorized Version once the language was modernized for an 18th-century audience.

Since the Parables were written with the aim of teaching, Todd Parker claims that the Parables, and the other religious works of Christopher Smart, are part of his final push for the "evangelization of London's reading public." Even if they were not spreading an "evangelical" message, the books were still intended to promote proper conduct. In addition to teaching Christianity, the parables are set up against the interpretations of Bible held by the Roman Catholic Church and against the Roman Church itself.

Most of the Parables come from traditional Christian Parables, but Smart extended the original interpretation of what a "parable" is to include any "parabolic discourse" that could convey Christian doctrine "through, or with the aid of, similes, metaphors, proverbs, and other indirect forms of expression." Christopher Smart is not alone in interpreting parables in this manner because the Old Testament tradition of parables "meant first of all a comparison of some kind, but... included a wide variety of metaphires, similitudes, riddles, mysteries and illustrations."

See also

 Hymns and Spiritual Songs
 A Song to David

Notes

References
 Mounsey, Chris. Christopher Smart: Clown of God. Lewisburg: Bucknell University Press, 2001. 342 pp.
Parker, Todd C. "Smart's Enlightened Parables and the Problem of Genre." In Christopher Smart and the Enlightenment, edited by Clement Hawes, 83-97. New York, NY: St. Martin's, 1999. 308 pp.
 Smart, Christopher. The Poetical Works of Christopher Smart, II: Religious Poetry 1763-1771. Ed. Marcus Walsh and Karina Williamson. Oxford: Clarendon, 1983. 472 pp.
 Wilder, A. N. Early Christian Rhetoric. Harvard University Press, 1971.
 Williamson, Karina. "Christopher Smart's Hymns and Spiritual Songs", PQ xxxviii (1959): 149.

18th-century British children's literature
1768 poems
British poems
Children's poetry books
Christian poetry
Poetry by Christopher Smart
Christian children's books